Shanywathit is a town in Hlaingbwe Township, Hpa-an District, in the Kayin State of Myanmar. In the 2014 census, the town had a population of 21,735.

References 

Populated places in Kayin State